Milenko Filipović (born 12 March 1953) is a politician in Serbia. He was the mayor of Sremski Karlovci from 2004 to 2016 and was also a member of the Assembly of Vojvodina from 2008 to 2011. At different times in his career, Filipović was a member of G17 Plus and the Democratic Party (Demokratska stranka, DS).

Early life and career
Filipović was born in Sremski Karlovci, Autonomous Province of Vojvodina, in what was then the People's Republic of Serbia in the Federal People's Republic of Yugoslavia. He is a graduate of the University of Novi Sad's Faculty of Law and has served as a judge on the municipal court in Novi Sad. He began practicing law in 1991.

Politician

Local politics
Serbia introduced the direct election of mayors at the 2004 local elections. Filipović was elected as mayor of Sremski Karlovci in the second round of voting, after receiving endorsements from G17 plus, the DS, the Democratic Party of Serbia (Demokratska stranka Sribje, DSS), and the Serbian Renewal Movement. He became a member of G17 Plus either before or shortly after the election. 

Filipović appeared in the 235th position out of 250 on G17 Plus's electoral list in the 2007 Serbian parliamentary election. The list won nineteen mandates, and he was not chosen as part of his party's assembly delegation. (From 2000 to 2011, parliamentary mandates in Serbia were awarded to sponsoring parties or coalitions rather than to individual candidates, and it was common practice for the mandates to be distributed out of numerical order. Filipović could have received a mandate notwithstanding his position on the list, which was in any event mostly alphabetical.)

The direct election of mayors was abandoned after the 2004 election; since that time, mayors in Serbia have been chosen by the elected members of city and municipal assemblies. In the 2008 local elections, Filipović led the For a European Serbia alliance, which included the DS and G17 Plus, to a majority victory in Sremski Karlovci with fifteen out of twenty-five mandates. He was chosen for a second term as mayor afterwards.<ref>Lokalni Izbori 2008; Bureau of Statistics, Republic of Serbia; pp. 12, 46.</ref> Following the election, he left G17 Plus and joined the DS.

Filopović led the DS's electoral list to a plurality victory with eight seats in the 2012 local elections and was subsequently confirmed for a third term in office.Službeni List (Opštine Sremski Karlovci), 7 May 2012, pp. 2-3. In October 2013, he brought the rival Serbian Progressive Party into the municipal governing alliance.

He led his own independent list in the 2016 Serbian local elections. The list won five seats, finishing second against the Progressives. After the election, a candidate of the Progressive Party was chosen as the municipality's new mayor."OTVOREN NOVI VRTIĆ PU „RADOSNO DETINјSTVO“ U SREMSKIM KARLOVCIMA", City of Novi Sad, 12 September 2016, accessed 6 July 2021. Filipović was not a candidate for re-election to the municipal assembly in 2020.

Provincial politics
While serving as mayor, Filipović was also elected to the Assembly of Vojvodina in the 2008 provincial election in the Sremski Karlovci division as a candidate of the For a European Vojvodina alliance. For a European Vojvodina'' won an outright majority in the election, and Filipović served as a supporter of the administration. He resigned from the assembly on 7 December 2011, after restrictions were introduced on holding dual mandates.

Electoral record

Provincial (Vojvodina)

Municipal (Sremski Karlovci)

References

1956 births
Living people
People from Sremski Karlovci
Members of the Assembly of Vojvodina
Mayors of places in Serbia
G17 Plus politicians
Democratic Party (Serbia) politicians